German-Montenegrin relations are foreign relations between Germany and Montenegro.  Both countries established diplomatic relations on 14 June 2006. Germany has an embassy in Podgorica.  Montenegro has an embassy in Berlin and a general consulate in Frankfurt.
Both countries are members of Council of Europe and NATO. Also Germany is an EU member and Montenegro is an EU candidate.
In 1997 the German Bundeswehr used the Podgorica Airport for the Operation Libelle, which led to the first skirmish involving German forces since World War II.

See also 
 Foreign relations of Germany
 Foreign relations of Montenegro 
 Accession of Montenegro to the European Union
 Germany–Yugoslavia relations
 East Germany–Yugoslavia relations

References

External links
  German Federal Foreign Office about relations with Montenegro
  German embassy in Podgorica (in German and Serbian only)
  Montenegro embassy in Berlin

 
Montenegro 
Bilateral relations of Montenegro